Anandam is a 2001 Indian Telugu-language romance film, directed by Srinu Vaitla and starring Akash and Rekha in the lead roles. The music of the film was composed by Devi Sri Prasad. The film was sensational hit at box office and ran for 200 days in two centers, 175 days in two centers and 100 days in all major centers.It was a  commercial and critical success of the time. This film made Akash an overnight star of the Telugu film industry. The film was remade in Tamil as Inidhu Inidhu Kaadhal Inidhu and Kannada as Anand, both versions being produced by Ramoji Rao.

Plot
Kiran (Akash) and Aishwarya (Rekha) are neighbours since childhood and always fight with each other on trivial things. Kiran hates her so much that he feels relieved when she moves to Ooty along with her parents. There, Aishwarya comes across an unopened greeting card addressed to Deepika (Tanu Roy). She learns that Deepika's family were the previous tenants in that home and tries to find out the whereabouts of Deepika to hand over the greeting card. But she finds out that Deepika committed suicide unwilling to marry the person chosen by her parents and as her plans of elopement failed as her boyfriend did not come to rescue her.

Aishwarya feels bad for Deepika and tries to leave the matter, but couldn't when she finds letters written by Vamsi, Deepika's boyfriend. She reads them and gets moved by the emotion in it. She decides to break the information of Deepika's suicide to Vamsi, but first, she writes a letter to him as Deepika to prepare him for the bad news. On the other hand, Vamsi was no more as he dies in an accident while coming to Deepika to marry her. Incidentally, Kiran was Vamsi's friend and receives the letter written by Aishwarya. He too wants to prepare Deepika slowly for bad news and write her back as Vamsi. They continue exchanging letters for some more time and at last decide to break the news and arrange a meeting.

When they see each other instead of Deepika and Vamsi, they get shocked and slowly reveal the truth to each other. They both get impressed with each other for the sympathetic and competent handling of the sensitive matter. They move back to their places but start to having feelings for each other. Slowly they express their emotions and become one.

Cast

 Akash as Kiran
 Rekha as Aishwarya
 Venkat as Vamsi
 Tanu Roy as Deepika
 Chandra Mohan as Aishwarya's father
 Tanikella Bharani as Kiran's father
 Dharmavarapu Subramanyam as College Lecturer 
 Brahmanandam as House Owner
 Chitram Seenu as Chandu
 Shiva Reddy as Purse
 Ramachandra as Kiran's friend
 Sudha as Aishwarya's mother
 Delhi Rajeswari as Kiran's mother
 M S Narayana as House Owner
 Jaya Prakash Reddy as Police Officer
 Banerjee as Deepika's father
 Jenny as College lecturer
 Shankar Melkote as House Owner
 Babloo as Kiran's friend
 Nutan Prasad
 Shweta Menon in a special appearance in the song "Mona Lisa"

Production
Uday Kiran and Shriya Saran were initially considered for the lead roles. Newcomer Akash was cast as the lead despite not knowing Telugu at the time. He wrote down his dialogues in Tamil and English. Rekha Vedavyas made her Telugu debut with this film. Jayaprakash Reddy turned comedian with this film.

Soundtrack
The soundtrack is composed by Devi Sri Prasad. The soundtrack of the movie is released through Mayuri Audio. The songs were well received.

Release
Jeevi of Idlebrain gave the film a rating of three out of five stars and opined that "Over all, this film is a good experiment, which did not worked well if you take the totality of the film". Gudipoodi Srihari of The Hindu opined that "Dialogues prove to be the basic strength of the film, particularly during the humorous scenes. Akash and Rekha make a good pair and their performances suit the characters they play". E. M. Bhargava of Full Hyderabad opined that "credit should be given to the director for treating the story with a lot of care (pardoning him a few unnecessary scenes) and for creating the feel good factor. The film certainly becomes worth a watch".

References

External links

2001 films
2000s Telugu-language films
2000s buddy films
2000s romance films
Films directed by Srinu Vaitla
Indian buddy films
Indian romance films
Telugu films remade in other languages
Films shot in Visakhapatnam